Evansville, Indiana is the home to two minor league professional sports teams and one amateur sports team. The city is also the home to two NCAA collegiate teams, and nine high schools that participate in the Indiana High School Athletic Association. Evansville is also the host to the annual Hoosier Nationals and Demolition City Roller Derby.

Professional teams

Evansville Otters

The Evansville Otters are a professional baseball team based in Evansville. The team is part of the west division of the Frontier League. The Otters have won two league titles (2006, 2016) and five division titles (1997, 2000, 2003, 2004, 2006) since their inception in 1995. The team plays at Bosse Field, which has been used for professional baseball since it opened in 1915 and is the third oldest ballpark used for professional baseball on a regular basis in America. The Otters were previously known as the Lancaster Scouts (1993–1994).

Evansville Thunderbolts

The Evansville Thunderbolts are a professional ice hockey team based in Evansville. The team is part of the Southern Professional Hockey League. The Thunderbolts' home arena is the Ford Center where they play all 28 of their home games. The Thunderbolts replaced the ECHL's Evansville IceMen after the IceMen's owner, Ron Geary, and the city of Evansville failed to come to an agreement for a new lease at the Ford Center during the 2015–16 season.

Amateur sports

Demolition City Roller Derby

Demolition City Roller Derby is a women's flat-track roller derby league in Evansville, Indiana and a member of the Women's Flat Track Derby Association. They compete at Soldiers and Sailors Memorial Coliseum.

Dynamite Dolls

The Dynamite Dolls are the A-team for the Demolition City Roller Derby.

Destruction Dames

The Destruction Dames are the B-team for the Demolition City Roller Derby.

Evansville Legends FC

The Evansville Legends FC are an amateur soccer team that was formed in 2021 by Marquette soccer alumnus Steve McCullough. The Legends compete in the River Conference of the Ohio Valley Premier League and play home games at Old National Bank Field at Goebel Sports Complex.

Collegiate sports
Evansville has two universities that are members of the NCAA: the University of Evansville (Purple Aces) and University of Southern Indiana (Screaming Eagles). These schools have a combined 9 team national championships.

*In NCAA Division II

Evansville Purple Aces

The University of Evansville (UE) is a member of NCAA Division I and the Missouri Valley Conference. UE has 14 NCAA Division I varsity sports, eight for women and six for men.

The University of Evansville athletics department was built upon a foundation of success in men's basketball, including NCAA College Division (now Division II) national championships in 1959, 1960, 1964, 1965 and 1971. The team was led by legendary coach Arad McCutchan from 1946 to 1977 who led the Purple Aces to a 515–313 record. In 1977 UE began playing in NCAA Division I athletics.

Southern Indiana Screaming Eagles
The University of Southern Indiana (USI) Athletic Department, currently in NCAA Division I as a member of the Ohio Valley Conference. USI sponsors 15 varsity intercollegiate sports. USI was a member of the Great Lakes Valley Conference of the NCAA Division II from 1970 to 2022, switching to the Division I Ohio Valley Conference on July 1, 2022.

Since 1990, all 15 Screaming Eagles teams have participated in their respective national tournaments and/or were ranked at the national level. USI has claimed four national championships (men's basketball, 1995; baseball, 2010 and 2014; softball, 2018), finished three times as the national finalist (men's basketball, 1994 and 2004; women's basketball, 1997), and earned one third-place finish (men's cross country, 1982).

Defunct teams

Evansville has had a long history with professional sports teams. Past professional organizations have included the NFL, Triple-A minor league baseball, arena football, minor league ice hockey, and professional basketball. Past Evansville major league, minor league, and semi-professional teams have won a combined 17 championships.

Baseball

Football

Basketball

Ice hockey

Soccer

Events hosted

NCAA events
From 1957 to 1975, Evansville hosted the final phase of the NCAA Division II men's basketball tournament, the Elite Eight, at Roberts Municipal Stadium, and then again in 2002. The city is also slated to host the event at the Ford Center in 2014. From 1999 to 2007, Roberts Stadium hosted the Great Lakes Valley Conference basketball tournaments, and in 2013 and 2014 the same event was held at the Ford Center. Since 2018, Ford Center has hosted the Ohio Valley Conference men's and women's tournaments.

A number of Division I NCAA events have been hosted by the city as well. In 1983, Roberts Stadium hosted the first round of the NCAA Men's Division I Basketball Championship, and in 1980 and 1983 it hosted the Midwestern City Conference (now Horizon League) men's basketball conference tournament.

Thunder on the Ohio

From 1938 to 1940 and 1979 to 2009, Evansville hosted Thunder on the Ohio, a hydroplane boat race in the H1 Unlimited season. The race was held on the Ohio River in downtown Evansville. The winner of Thunder on the Ohio received the Four Freedoms Trophy, which was named after the nearby Four Freedoms Monument which rests along the Ohio River. The race had frequently been broadcast on ESPN and the SPEED television network.

Thunder on the Ohio had been an Unlimited hydroplane mainstay for 30 consecutive years. "Ideal Evansville" replaced Owensboro, Kentucky, on the unlimited calendar in 1979. Evansville was the world headquarters of Atlas Van Lines, Inc., which sponsored Bill Muncey's race team. Muncey played a major role in Evansville being awarded its first sanction.

Prior to Thunder on the Ohio, the 725 Cubic Inch Class boats, the forerunners of the modern unlimiteds, raced at Evansville from 1938 through 1940. Dave Villwock had won more Evansville races than anyone else, including seven with Miss Budweiser.

Evansville HydroFest

Hydroplane racing returned to Evansville in 2017, with the introduction of the Evansville Hydrofest, an American Power Boat Association event.

The Refrigerator Bowl

From 1948 to 1956, Evanville hosted the annual college football Refrigerator Bowl. Currently, Evansville is the only city in Indiana to have hosted a college football bowl game.

High school state championships
Evansville has a proud high school sport heritage, including 88 team championships. Evansville has nine active city high schools that participate in the Indiana High School Athletic Association. The 88 team titles won by Evansville city high schools includes 26 soccer titles, 17 football titles, 13 wrestling titles, 9 basketball titles, 6 tennis titles, 9 golf titles, 5 baseball titles, 2 softball titles, and 1 bowling title. Defunct IHSAA high schools from Evansville that are no longer active include Evansville Rex Mundi and Evansville Lincoln.* = indicates title won before IHSAA State Tournament was initiated+ = indicates sanctioned by the Indiana High School Bowling Association''

Notable athletes

Baseball

 Alan Benes, MLB baseball player
 Andy Benes, MLB baseball player
 Jamey Carroll, MLB baseball player
 Bob Coleman, MLB manager, Evansville minor league baseball coach, Indiana Baseball Hall of Famer
 Charlie Dexter, MLB baseball player
Jerad Eickhoff, MLB baseball player
 Ervin "Pete" Fox, MLB player
 Charles Knoll, MLB baseball player
 Clarence "Big Boy" Kraft, MLB baseball player
 Don Mattingly, MLB baseball player and coach
 Edd Roush, MLB Baseball Hall of Famer
 Jack Warner, MLB baseball player
 Jeff Schulz, MLB baseball player
 Jim "Lefty" Wallace, MLB baseball player
 Paul Splittorff, MLB baseball player
 Ray Newman, MLB baseball player
 Sam Thompson, MLB Baseball Hall of Fame
 Al Schellhase, MLB baseball player
 Syl "Sammy" Simon, MLB baseball player

Basketball

 Arad McCutchan, basketball hall of fame coach
 Bob Ford, ABA basketball player; collegiate telecaster
 Calbert Cheaney, NBA basketball player
 Dave Schellhase, NBA basketball player
 Don Buse, NBA basketball player and former All Star
 Gus Doerner, NBA basketball player
 Jerry Sloan, NBA basketball coach
 Larry Humes, NCAA basketball All-American for the University of Evansville
 Marv Bates, Univ. of Evansville basketball sportscaster; former Indiana Sportscaster of the Year
 Ted Bernhardt, NBA basketball referee
 Walter McCarty, NBA basketball player

Cycling
 Frank Kramer, 18-time national sprint bicycling champion, 2-time Grand Prix de Paris Champion, first American to win the World Professional Sprint Championship, US Bicycling Hall of Famer

Football

 Billy Hillenbrand, NFL football player
 Bob Griese, NFL All-Star, All-Pro, Hall of Famer
 Budd Boetticher, Ohio State University football player
 Deke Cooper, NFL football player
 Don Hansen, NFL football player
 Don Ping, NCAA football coach
 Doug Bell, NFL football player; Kodak All-American Ball State University
 Kevin Hardy, NFL football player
 Larry Stallings, NFL linebacker
 Ray "Bibbles" Bawel, NFL football player
 Scott Studwell, NFL linebacker
 Sean Bennett, NFL football player

Golf
 Bob Hamilton, PGA Tour professional golfer; 1944 PGA Championship winner
 Brian Tennyson, PGA Tour, Asian Tour golfer; won 1987 Indian Open & 1987 Philippine Open 
 Darrett Brinker, Web.com Tour professional golfer
 Jeff Overton, PGA Tour professional golfer

Ice hockey
 Kira Hurley, professional ice hockey player for Evansville IceMen, Hockey Hall of Fame

Horse Racing
 Chic Anderson, sportscaster
 Hillsdale ((Thoroughbred)), one of only 5 horses in history to sweep the prestigious Santa Anita's Strub Stakes Series

Soccer
 David Weir, European club soccer player, Scottish national team captain, University of Evansville All-American
 Josh Tudela, MLS and USL soccer player
 Scott Cannon, MLS soccer player
 Steve Klein, MLS and USL soccer player

Swimming
 Lilly King, swimmer, gold medalist at 2016 Summer Olympics in 100m Breaststroke.

Tennis
 Byron "Buddy" Buckley, Indiana High School Tennis Coaches Hall of Famer
 Louise Owen, tennis player
 Sara Turber, formerly ranked second in the world in Lawn Tennis
 Woodie Sublette-Walker, Chief of tennis officials for the 1996 Olympic Games in Atlanta

Track & Field
 Charles Hornbostel, United States Olympic Track & Field team member in 1932 and 1936
 Roger Brown, Evansville, Indiana (United States), 1984 Big Ten Outdoor champion for Indiana University, high jump 7–0.25" (2.14); Billy Hayes Inv. Outdoor Record (1986), jumped 7–1.75 (2.18) Champion

Wrestling
 Andrew Thomas, Total Nonstop Action Wrestling producer and referee
 Ralph Wilson, professional wrestler
 Rudy Charles, Total Nonstop Action Wrestling referee

References